The Sale of Goods Act 1908 was an Act of Parliament passed in New Zealand that was repealed by the Contract and Commercial Law Act 2017.

The coverage of consumer goods is now covered by the Consumer Guarantees Act 1993.

References

External links
Text of the Act

Statutes of New Zealand
New Zealand business law
Repealed New Zealand legislation